Parethelcus pollinarius is a species of weevil native to Europe.

References

Curculionidae
Beetles described in 1802
Beetles of Europe
Taxa named by Johann Reinhold Forster